Nikolas Asprogenous (Greek: Νικόλας Ασπρογένους; born 6 April 1986) is a Cypriot former professional footballer who played as a goalkeeper.

Club career
On 12 June 2004, Asprogenous signed a four-year contract with Partizan. He received the number 30 shirt for the 2004–05 season, but failed to make any appearances in the process. In the following 2005–06 season, Asprogenous made his senior debuts for Partizan, collecting five league appearances. He made his international debut for the club on 14 December 2006, in a 0–1 loss to Rangers at Ibrox Stadium. Ahead of the 2007–08 season, Asprogenous was placed on the transfer list, before leaving the club at the end of his contract.

In mid-2008, Asprogenous returned to his homeland and signed with Omonia. He was mainly a backup to Antonis Georgallides, appearing in just two league games during the 2008–09 season. In early 2010, Asprogenous was loaned to Aris Limassol. He made one appearance for the club in its 0–5 loss against APOEL. In September 2010, Asprogenous moved to Anorthosis, but failed to make any appearances in the 2010–11 season.

In the summer of 2011, Asprogenous joined Cypriot Second Division side AEP Paphos, helping the club win promotion to the top flight in 2011–12. He subsequently played for Ethnikos Assia and Nikos & Sokratis Erimis.

International career
After representing his country at Under-19 level, Asprogenous made his official debut for the Cyprus U21s in March 2005. He played the full 90 minutes in all eight of his team's games during the European Under-21 Championship 2009 qualifying stage.

In August 2009, Asprogenous received his first call-up to the full squad by manager Angelos Anastasiadis for Cyprus's World Cup 2010 qualifiers against Republic of Ireland and Montenegro, but failed to make his debut.

Statistics

References

External links
 

Cypriot footballers
AC Omonia players
AEP Paphos FC players
Anorthosis Famagusta F.C. players
Aris Limassol FC players
Association football goalkeepers
Cypriot expatriate footballers
Cypriot First Division players
Cyprus under-21 international footballers
Cyprus youth international footballers
Ethnikos Assia FC players
Expatriate footballers in Serbia
Expatriate footballers in Serbia and Montenegro
First League of Serbia and Montenegro players
FK Partizan players
Nikos & Sokratis Erimis FC players
Serbian SuperLiga players
Sportspeople from Limassol
1986 births
Living people